Chillum is an unincorporated area and census-designated place in Prince George's County, Maryland, United States, bordering Washington, D.C. and Montgomery County.

In addition to being its own unincorporated neighborhood, Chillum is also a census-designated place covering a larger area than the Chillum neighborhood. As of the 2010 census, the Chillum CDP included Chillum, as well as the adjacent unincorporated communities of Avondale, Carole Highlands, Green Meadows, and Lewisdale.  The population was 36,039 at the 2020 census.

Chillum, the neighborhood, is contained between the Northwest Branch Anacostia River to the east, East West Highway (MD 410) and the Sligo Creek River to the north, New Hampshire Avenue (MD 650) to the west, and Eastern Avenue NE to the south. Chillum borders the adjacent communities of Avondale, Green Meadows, and Carole Highlands in Prince George's County as well as the city of Takoma Park in Montgomery County, and the Riggs Park (also known as, "Lamond Riggs"), Queens Chapel, and North Michigan Park neighborhoods of Northeast Washington D.C.

Geography
Chillum is located at  (38.968210, −76.979046).

Chillum is unincoporated and does not have its own zipcode; therefore it relies on its neighboring city of Hyattsville for its postal addresses/ zipcodes. While a vast majority of the residents living in/ businesses located in Chillum, MD are assigned the Hyattsville postal zipcodes of either 20782, or 20783, there are a few residents living on the far west side of Chillum/ businesses located very close to New Hampshire Avenue (MD 650) and the Prince George's/ Montgomery County Line, bordering the city of Takoma Park, MD, are assigned the Takoma Park, MD zipcode of 20912. Residents of Chillum that are assigned Takoma Park's 20912 zipcode have Takoma Park addresses though they are not even located within Takoma Park's boundaries. All of the other residents living in / businesses located in Chillum, have Hyattsville addresses.

History
Chillum takes its name from "Chillum Castle Manor," the  land patent established in 1763, by William Dudley Digges.  It included lands in the present-day District of Columbia and in Prince George's County, and was composed of previously established land patents such as Henrietta Maria, Widows Purchase, Yarrow and Yarrow Head. Chillum Castle Manor was named after Chilham Castle, the old home of Sir Dudley Digges, an ancestor of William Dudley Digges, in Kent, England.

The manor house for the Henrietta Maria parcel was named Green Hill. It was home to William Dudley Digges and was the place where Pierre L'Enfant, designer of nearby Washington, D.C., died in destitution in 1825.  He remained buried at the Green Hill property until being re-interred at Arlington National Cemetery in 1909.  The Green Hill plantation was subsequently purchased by George Washington Riggs, who built the present Green Hill historic home in 1868.

Since this area was not served by public transportation, such as a streetcar, Chillum remained rural in character into the 1930s. Beginning in the mid-1930s, the area of Chillum that is close to the District of Columbia border was subdivided into lots. Developers promoted the area’s convenient access into the city as well as its water, gas, and electricity supply. The first platted developments in the late 1930s included Chillum Gardens and Oakdale Terrace. The developers of these communities sold the lots but left the construction of houses to the lot owners. Consequently, the communities were slow to develop. In contrast, the developer-built Green Meadows and Brookdale Manor were platted in the early 1940s and completed by 1942. Other developer-built communities begun in the 1940s include Chillumgate (1946) and Michigan Hills Park (1940s). Several subdivisions were constructed along Riggs Road, Sargent Road, and Sligo Creek Park in the 1950s, including Sargent Knolls (1950), Bel Air Estates (1955), Parkland (1955), Carrington (1957), and Miller Estates (mid-1950s-early 1960s). The street pattern of these communities are typical of their period. They have a grid pattern of streets broken by a few curvilinear roadways and cul-de-sacs. In addition to single-family residences, two apartment communities were constructed in 1949. The Chillum Heights Apartments consist of three story brick structures containing a combined total of 1,147 units. Larger-scale apartment complexes and mid-rise structures were constructed in the 1960s.

Commerce

Riggs Plaza Shopping Center
This shopping center is located at the intersections of Riggs Road, Chillum Road, and Eastern Avenue NE, right next to the Maryland/District of Columbia line. It was established in the 1960s and is anchored by Giant Food Store, Ruff Ruff n' Ready seafood shop, Merchant's Auto Repair, Riggs Plaza barber shop, Clarisa's Dominican hair salon, CoinStar laundromat, and a Sunoco gas station. The Giant supermarket in this shopping center serves not only the Chillum neighborhood but also residents living in the nearby Riggs Park and Fort Totten neighborhoods of NE D.C. The Giant Food Store opened in Riggs Plaza Shopping Center in July 1997. It moved into the shopping center from its former location on 300 Riggs Road, NE, which was located about a few miles south of Chillum in the Riggs Park neighborhood of Washington, D.C. Across from the Riggs Plaza Shopping Center on Riggs Road (MD 212) is Mo's laundromat.

Riggs-Sargent Shopping Center
This shopping center was established at the beginning of the 1970s and is located at the intersection of Riggs Road (MD 212) and Sargent Road (MD 211). The Riggs-Sargent Shopping Center consists of a vacant big box space (vacated by Kmart in early 2020), Davco Shoe Store, Pizza Hut, and Wendy's. The Riggs-Sargent Shopping Center originally consisted of only a Memco Department Store, which closed in January 1983 and was replaced by a Bradlees discount store. Shortly after Bradlees opened, Pizza Hut, Wendy's, and Shoe Depot opened in the Riggs-Sargent Shopping Center as outparcels of the Bradlees. The Bradlees operated in the Riggs-Sargent Shopping Center until 1988, when the Bradlees chain filed for bankruptcy and closed many of its stores. In October 1989, Kmart opened in the Riggs-Sargent Shopping Center, taking over Bradlees' former spot. Kmart maintained the ring-shaped canopy in its store entrance that Memco originally had. Kmart closed in early 2020.

Sargent Road Shopping Center
This shopping center is located at the intersection of Sargent Road (MD 211) and Chillum Road (MD 501). It consists of a Ti Nails shop, CVS Pharmacy, Family Dollar (formerly Maxway), Pollo a La Brasa restaurant, and a Save-a-Lot supermarket. The Save-a-Lot Supermarket is housed in what used to be A&P supermarket's spot inside the Sargent Road Shopping Center until that chain went bankrupt and closed all of its supermarket stores in the Washington, D.C., metropolitan area.

Takoma Park Shopping Center
This shopping center is located on the far northwest side of Chillum, located next to the Prince George's/Montgomery County line, bordering the city of Takoma Park, just south of the intersection of East West Highway (MD 410) and New Hampshire Avenue (MD 650). This shopping center consists of a supermarket anchor that was until January 2020 occupied by Shoppers Food & Pharmacy (formerly a Jumbo Food Store until the chain's name switched to Shoppers in the mid-1980s), U-Haul truck rental facility, Dunkin' Donuts/Baskin Robbins, Beauty Mart store, Wendy's restaurant, Soap Eze laundromat, Caribbean Sea restaurant, La Cuscatleca restaurant, China House restaurant, Dollar Plus, Sky Nails, Tom's Carryout restaurant, Liberty Tax, Autozone, and State Farm Insurance agency. All of these businesses have Takoma Park addresses, although they are not in the city of Takoma Park. The Shoppers Food closed in January 2020 and has replaced by Lidl and a future Planet Fitness.

Northeast of the Takoma Park Shopping Center on East West Highway (MD 410), there is also a Red Top gas station. This gas station also has a Takoma Park address, although it is located on the far west side of Chillum.

Takoma Park Plaza
This shopping center is located at the intersection of New Hampshire Avenue (MD 650) and Sheridan Street on the far west side of Chillum, right next to the Prince George's/Montgomery County line, bordering the city of Takoma Park. Takoma Park Plaza is located a few blocks south on New Hampshire Avenue (MD 650) from the Takoma Park Shopping Center. Takoma Park Plaza consists of a Las Aguilaz international supermarket, El Paraiso Tex-Mex/Salvadorean restaurant, Tax 4 All store, a liquor store, Von Lique Fashion, Krystal Jewelry & Gifts, a Chinese restaurant, U.S. Nails, and Cosmo Wig and Beauty Supply. Across Sheridan Street to the south, there is a Urgent Walk-In Medical Care clinic as well as a Bank of America branch, State Farm Insurance Agency, Fresenius Kidney Care clinic, Next Day Embroidery, My Own Place Inc, and Quality First career center. All of these businesses have Takoma Park addresses, although they are not in the city of Takoma Park.

Shop Rite Shopping Center
This shopping center is located on the far southwest side of Chillum, at the intersection of New Hampshire Avenue (MD 650) and Eastern Avenue NE, right next to the Maryland/District of Columbia line and the Prince George's/Montgomery County line. This shopping center also borders the city of Takoma Park. The Shop Rite Shopping Center consists of a Caribbean Gardens restaurant, Afresco Foods supermarket, Noveau Hair Salon, Famous Pawnbrokers, Roberns Automotive Service Center, Western Union branch, Dennis Express convenience store, and a McDonald's restaurant. All of these businesses have Takoma Park addresses, even though they are not in the city of Takoma Park.

Sheridan Station Shopping Center
This shopping center is located at the intersections of Riggs Road (MD 212), Sheridan Street, and Chillum Road (MD 501). It is located directly northwest of the Riggs Plaza Shopping Center and consists of a Mi Patria Latin-American Restaurant & Sports Bar, Barber/ Salon Shop, Eco Dry Cleaners, Dollar Plus & Grocery Store, Supersuds Laundromat, Charcoal Chicken Latin American Restaurant, Dollar Queen Store, Pollo Silvestre Mexican/ Salvadorean Chicken Restaurant, and a Dr. Wash car wash. Across from the Sheridan Station Shopping Center on Chillum Road (MD 501), there is a BP gas station, Chevron gas station, and Pronto Auto Parts store.

Across the Sheridan Station Shopping Center on Riggs Road (MD 212), there used to a Junction International Market Jerk Center which specialized in Caribbean Food. Since that store closed a few years ago, its spot has been occupied by a 7-Eleven convenience store. Next to it lies a Carol's Hair Design salon and Escobar Grill Latin American restaurant.
In addition to these seven shopping centers, Chillum also contains another small, unnamed shopping center, located at the intersection of Riggs Road (MD 212) and East West Highway (MD 410). This shopping center consists of San Alejo Comedor & Papuseria Salvadorean restaurant (formerly Seven Star Chinese carryout), His & Hers Uni Sex Nail Salon, Papa John's Pizza, and Rite Aid pharmacy. In mid- to late 2015, the Rite Aid was remodeled. The Rite Aid closed in 2019, and its site is vacant as of January 2020.

Government and infrastructure
The Chillum-Adelphi Volunteer Fire Department (CAVFD) serves Chillum. The station is in Langley Park CDP and has an Adelphi postal address. In March 1951 and June 8, 1951 the CAVFD was established and chartered, respectively. From November and March 1953 the fire station on Riggs Road was constructed; the County Volunteer Firemen's Association designated it Station No. 34. Portions of Station No. 34 were rebuilt in the early 1960s, and it was rededicated on November 16, 1963. In 1962 the CAVFD began building a substation, No. 44, which was dedicated on November 16, 1963, but in 1992 it sold the substation to the county government. PGFD Station 844 now provides fire and EMS services to the Chillum area.

Education

The Chillum CDP is served by public schools that are part of the Prince George's County Public Schools System.

Elementary schools within the Chillum CDP include Chillum Elementary School, Cesar Chavez, Lewisdale, Rosa Parks, and Ridgecrest. Chavez was originally known as Parkway Elementary School. The school administration decided to rename the school after they found a liquor store had a similar name. According to principal Adela Acosta, the community chose Chavez since he was Hispanic/Latino as was most of the school's students. The parent-teacher organization chose Chavez, the school held a public hearing on the matter on January 10, 2000, and the county board approved the name change on March 30, 2000; it was effective fall 2000.

Carole Highlands Elementary School has a Takoma Park postal address but is within the 2010-defined Langley Park CDP boundaries. As of the 1990 US Census and the 2000 US Census, Carole Highlands Elementary, as well as all of the Langley Park CDP areas south of Road 193, was in the Chillum CDP. Carole Highlands Elementary serves parts of the current Chillum CDP.

Nicholas Orem Middle School in Hyattsville and Buck Lodge Middle School in Adelphi CDP serve sections of the CDP. Northwestern High School in Hyattsville and High Point High School in Beltsville CDP serve sections of the CDP.

In addition to these public schools, Chillum is also served by four private schools; the St. John's De La Salle School, Children's Guild School, Parkway School, and the George E. Peters Adventist School.

Parks and recreation
The Chillum neighborhood is served by three parks:

1. Chillum Community Park (This park is located at the intersection of Ray Road and Cypress Creek Drive on the far east side of Chillum, located directly west of the Northwest Branch Anacostia River but directly south of the Sligo Creek River. This park is contained between two neighborhoods, Chillum and Avondale. The part of Chillum Community Park located west of the Northwest Branch Anacostia River is in Chillum while the part of Chillum Community Park located east of the Northwest Branch Anacostia River is in Avondale. Both sides of the Chillum Community Park consist of a small-size playground and small-size picnic pavilion. The only difference is that the Chillum Community Park contains a soccer field on the Chillum side while containing a small-size basketball court on the Avondale side.

2. Michigan Park Hills Neighborhood Park (This park is located at the intersection of Chillum Road and 15th Avenue, directly across the Chillum Community Park. This park consists of a small-size playground, tennis court, small basketball court, and two small benches.

3. Parklawn Community Park (This park is located on East West Highway directly east of where the Sligo Creek River intersects East West Highway. This park is a very small park with nothing in it except for a bench and direct access to the Sligo Creek Trail).

In addition to these three parks, Chillum is also served by the Rollingrest Community Center/ Splash Pool, located on Sargent Road next to the Victory Crest and Rollingcrest Commons Apartment Complexes and Riggs-Sargent Shopping Center.

Apartment Complexes
Chillum consists of several different apartment complexes within its neighborhood boundaries, including:

1. Landmark Apartments (formerly Cypress Creek Apartments); located at the intersection of Chillum Road and 16th Avenue on the far east side if Chillum located west of the Northwest Branch Anacostia River and Chillum Community Park

2. Overlook Apartments; located at the intersection of Ray Road and Madison Street, north of Landmark Apartments but still west of the Chillum Community Park

3. Victory Crest Apartments; located at the intersection of Sargent Road and Ray Road

4. Rollingcrest Commons Apartments; located at the intersection of Sargent Road and Nicholson Street

5. Chillum Oaks Adventist Apartments; located at the intersection of Riggs Road and Ray Road across from Ridgecrest Elementary School but adjacent to the George E. Peters Adventist Day School

6. The Fairmont Apartments; located right across the intersection of Chillum Road and Chillumgate Road near the border of Washington D.C.

7. Tudor Place Apartments; located on the far southwest side of Chillum, bordering Washington D.C. at the intersection of Peabody Street and Eastern Avenue NE

8. Cannonbury Square Apartments; located at the intersection of Knollbrook Drive and Rittenhouse Street, bordering the city of Takoma Park in Montgomery County and located within very close proximity to Washington D.C.

9. Fleetwood Village Apartments; located on the far southwest side of Chillum, bordering Washington D.C. and city of Takoma Park in Montgomery County, at the intersection of Chillum Road and Eastern Avenue NE, adjacent to New Hampshire Avenue

10. Chillum Terrace Apartments; located directly north of the Cannonbury Square Apartments but south of the Sheridan Apartments south of the intersection of Knollbrook Drive and Sheridan Street, bordering the city of Takoma Park in Montgomery County and located within very close proximity to Washington D.C.

11. Sheridan Apartments; located directly north of the Chillum Terrace Apartments north of the intersection of Knollbrook Drive and Sheridan Street, bordering the city of Takoma Park in Montgomery County and located within very close proximity ti Washington D.C.

12. Belford Towers Apartments; located south of the Takoma Park Shopping Center but north of the intersection of New Hampshire Avenue and Ray Road, bordering the city of Takoma Park in Montgomery County

13. Fairview Townhomes; located at the intersection of Fairview Avenue and Red Top Road, bordering the city of Takoma Park in Montgomery County

14. Takoma Landing Apartments; located directly south of the Fairview Townhomes but east of the Takoma Park Shopping Center, bordering the city of Takoma Park in Montgomery County

15. Hampshire View Apartments; located on the far northwest side of Chillum at the intersection of East West Highway and Red Top Road behind the Uhaul Truck Rental Facility that is in the Takoma Park Shopping Center, directly east of New Hampshire Avenue, bordering the city of Takoma Park in Montgomery County

Transportation

Several highways/ major intersections pass through the neighborhood, such as East West Highway (MD 410), New Hampshire Avenue (MD 650), Riggs Road (MD 212), Sargent Road (MD 211), Chillum Road (MD 501), and Eastern Avenue NE.

Though Chillum residents do not have direct access to the Washington Metro, there are several stations located within very close proximity to area, including the Fort Totten Metro Station in Washington D.C. which is served by the Red, Yellow and Green lines, and most of the bus routes that operate in the area ferry passengers to this station. The Prince George's Plaza Metro Station is located just outside Chillum's boundaries in Hyattsville and is served by the Green and Yellow lines of the Washington Metro.

Historic sites
The following is a list of historic sites in Chillum identified by the Maryland-National Capital Park and Planning Commission:

Demographics

2020 census

Note: the US Census treats Hispanic/Latino as an ethnic category. This table excludes Latinos from the racial categories and assigns them to a separate category. Hispanics/Latinos can be of any race.

2020 American Community Survey 
At the 2020 American Community Survey, the CDP was 31.5% Salvadoran, 4% Guatemalan, 3.6% Dominican, 3% Honduran, 2.5% Mexican, .8% Puerto Rican.

2000 Census
As of the census of 2000, there were 34,252 people, 12,080 households, and 7,900 families residing in the CDP. The racial makeup of the CDP was 14.34% White, 62.68% African American, 0.47% Native American, 2.88% Asian, 0.08% Pacific Islander, 14.49% from other races, and 5.05% from two or more races. Hispanic or Latino of any race were 23.67% of the population.

In 2000, 5.2% of Chillum residents identified as being of Jamaican heritage. This was the highest percentage of Jamaican Americans of any place in Maryland. In the same year, 9% of Chillum identified as being of West Indian ancestry. However, since the 1990s, the Hispanic/Latino population has significantly increased in Chillum, MD as immigrants from countries all over Central America found plenty of labor/ janitorial/ housekeeping jobs in the Washington D.C. area and an abundance of affordable housing in Chillum, MD that would allow them to commute very easily and conveniently to their jobs. The Hispanic/Latino population gradually increased in Chillum over the past two decades to the point where they have overtaken the African-American/Jamaican population living in the area. There are also quite a few Caribbean and African immigrants as well that began settling in Chillum since the 1990s as well. The most commonly spoken foreign language in Chillum is Spanish.

There were 12,080 households, out of which 33.6% had children under the age of 18 living with them, 36.6% were married couples living together, 21.1% had a female householder with no husband present, and 34.6% were non-families. 26.8% of all households were made up of individuals, and 7.7% had someone living alone who was 65 years of age or older. The average household size was 2.80 and the average family size was 3.40.

In the CDP, the population was spread out, with 25.8% under the age of 18, 11.5% from 18 to 24, 34.0% from 25 to 44, 19.4% from 45 to 64, and 9.3% who were 65 years of age or older. The median age was 32 years. For every 100 females, there were 92.4 males. For every 100 females age 18 and over, there were 88.3 males.

The median income for a household in the CDP was $41,307, and the median income for a family was $46,329. Males had a median income of $29,546 versus $28,069 for females. The per capita income for the CDP was $17,915. About 8.5% of families and 10.2% of the population were below the poverty line, including 11.5% of those under age 18 and 8.8% of those age 65 or over.

Notable people
 Jonathan Banks, actor

References

External links

 Chillum-Adelphi Volunteer Fire Department
 A scalable PDF map of Prince George's County, MD showing the boundaries of the Chillum Census Designated Place and other CDPs and Census Incorporated Places in the county -- from the Maryland Department of Planning web site

Caribbean-American culture in Maryland
Census-designated places in Maryland
Census-designated places in Prince George's County, Maryland
Jamaican-American history
Washington metropolitan area
Suburbs of Washington, D.C.